Air Chathams Limited is an airline based in the Chatham Islands, New Zealand. It was established in 1984 and operates scheduled passenger services between the Chatham Islands and mainland New Zealand along with routes between Auckland and Whakatāne, and Auckland and Whanganui. Its main base is Chatham Islands / Tuuta Airport.

History 
The airline was set up by Craig and Marion Emeny in 1984, and facilitates the transportation of both freight and people to and from mainland New Zealand.

Craig Emeny first moved to the Chatham Islands as a pilot to operate services primarily between Chatham and Pitt Islands. At that time the lack of regularity in flights to mainland New Zealand saw him start his own airline and begin operations to mainland airports. Air Chathams had the advantage of being based on the Chatham Islands and were able to avoid many of the weather related issues that other airlines had operating to the Chathams. As the freight and passenger market developed Air Chathams grew from operating small piston engine aircraft to large 50 seat two engine turbo-prop aircraft.

In 2014 Air Chathams established a flight operations and maintenance base at Auckland International Airport. From this base the company provides maintenance services both internally and to third party airlines under contract. A fully owned subsidiary (Chathams Pacific) operated scheduled flights in Tonga until March 2013. The introduction of Chinese (PRC) aid financed aircraft and training facilities at the request of the Tongan government introduced competition to Chathams Pacific's routes. Air Chathams' management decided not to compete with the new airline, Real Tonga, and ceased all Tongan operations. With the Air New Zealand regional route cut backs, Air Chathams began serving the Auckland to Whakatāne route on 29 April 2015, Auckland to Whanganui on 31 July 2016 and Auckland to Kapiti Coast from 20 August 2018.

In mid 2018, the airline announced that it was looking to re-establish flights between Auckland and Norfolk Island. Air Chathams in April 2019 announced they will be taking over a fourth Air NZ route by starting a weekly service from Auckland to Norfolk Island on 6 September 2019.

Destinations

Air Chathams destinations 
This is a list of destinations served by Air Chathams, excluding subsidiaries.

Chathams Pacific destinations 
This is a list of destinations formerly served by Chathams Pacific, a wholly owned subsidiary of Air Chathams that operated between 2007 and 2013.

Fleet 

As of January 2019, the Air Chathams fleet includes the following aircraft:

The ATR, Saabs and Metroliners are used across the company's operations as well as contract freight services and charter work. The Cessna 206 provides a non-regular service between Chatham Island and Pitt Island and is on standby for search and rescue or local flights around the Chatham Islands. The airline's Aero Commander 690 has been wet-leased out for aerial mapping and survey duties, while the DC-3 is often chartered out for scenic flights and tours in a retro NAC livery.

In 2018 Air Chathams acquired an ATR 72-500 from Mount Cook Airline. The ATR 72-500 runs flights for Tauck Tours in summer seasons, while assisting with peak traffic to Whanganui in the winter.

References

External links

Air Chathams

Airlines of New Zealand
Airlines established in 1984
Chatham Islands
New Zealand companies established in 1984
2013 disestablishments in Tonga